Prescott may refer to:

People

Given name
 Prescott E. Bloom, American lawyer and politician
 Prescott Bush, American banker and politician
 Samuel Prescott Bush, American industrialist
 Prescott F. Hall, American lawyer, author and eugenicist  
 Samuel Prescott Hildreth, American physician, scientist and historian
 James Prescott Joule, English physicist
 Prescott Metcalf, American businessman and 8th mayor of Erie, Pennsylvania 
 Prescott Niles, American rock bassist 
 Prescott Townsend, American gay rights activist
 Prescott Wright, American animated film producer and distributor

Surname
 See: Prescott (surname)

Places

Canada
 Prescott, Ontario
 Prescott Island, Nunavut
 Cape Prescott, Nunavut

England
 Prescott, Gloucestershire

United States
 Prescott, Arizona
 Prescott, Arkansas
 Prescott, Indiana
 Prescott, Iowa
 Prescott, Kansas
 Prescott, Massachusetts
 Prescott, Michigan
 Prescott, Missouri
 Prescott, Oregon
 Prescott Township, Minnesota
 Prescott, Washington
 Prescott, Wisconsin

Other uses
 Prescott and Northwestern Railroad, in Arkansas, US
 Prescott College, in Arizona, US
 Prescott Group, a fictional company and its eponymous subsidiaries, created by Stephen Colbert
 Prescott Observatory, in Arizona, US
 Prescott Schools, in Adelaide, Australia
 Prescott Speed Hillclimb, a motorsport event in Gloucestershire, England
 Prescott, the code name of a generation of Intel Pentium 4 processors

See also
 Prescot, a town in Merseyside, England